Chrysoclysta grandis is a species of moth of the family Agonoxenidae. It is found in the western United States, in the mountains of California and Colorado.

The wingspan is 15–17 mm for males. Adults have been recorded from late July till late August.

Etymology
The name grandis refers to the large wingspan and the bright appearance.

References

Agonoxeninae
Moths described in 2002
Moths of North America